The Solidarity Party (Partido Solidaridad) was a political party in Panama that merged with the National Liberal Party (Partido Nacional Liberal) and formed the new Patriotic Union Party (Partido Union Patriótica).

At the legislative elections, 2 May 2004, the party won 15.7% of the popular vote and 9 out of 78 seats. Guillermo Endara on the same day, at the presidential election, won 30.9% of the vote. Endara subsequently set up his own party, the Fatherland's Moral Vanguard Party to contest the 2009 elections.

Defunct political parties in Panama
Socialism in Panama